Route 295 is a 98 km two-lane north/south highway in Quebec, Canada, which starts in  Saint-Jean-de-Dieu at the junction of Route 293 and ends in Dégelis at the junction of Autoroute 85.

List of towns along Route 295

 Saint-Jean-de-Dieu
 Sainte-Rita
 Saint-Guy
 Squatec
 Saint-Michel-du-Squatec
 Lejeune
 Auclair
 Lots Renverses
 Degelis

See also
 List of Quebec provincial highways

References

External links 
 Provincial Route Map (Courtesy of the Quebec Ministry of Transportation) 
 Route 295 on Google Maps

295